Mariamne (born 34 or 35) was a daughter of King Herod Agrippa I and  Cypros.  

She was betrothed by her father to Julius Archelaus, son of Chelcias (maybe Hilkiya in Hebrew who was a friend and an officer at the court), but this marriage had not yet been enacted upon her father's death.  Her brother Agrippa II enacted the marriage once he had been made tetrarch in around 49/50. From this marriage was derived a daughter, whose name was Berenice.
Around 65 she left her husband and married Demetrius of Alexandria who was its Alabarch and had a son from him named Agrippinus.

References

Jews and Judaism in the Roman Empire
30s births
Herodian dynasty
Year of death unknown

Date of death unknown